Cannibalism, the act of eating human flesh, is a recurring theme in popular culture, especially within the horror genre, and has been featured in a range of media that includes film, television, literature, music and video games. Cannibalism has been featured in various forms of media as far back as Greek mythology. The frequency of this theme has led to cannibal films becoming a notable subgenre of horror films. The subject has been portrayed in various different ways and is occasionally normalized. The act may also be used in media as a means of survival, an accidental misfortune, or an accompaniment to murder. Examples of prominent artists who have worked with the topic of cannibalism include William Shakespeare, Voltaire, Bret Easton Ellis, and Herschell Gordon Lewis.

In literature, film, and television

As a cultural norm

Many works in popular culture depict groups of people for whom cannibalism is a cultural norm.

Film
Many horror films, known as cannibal films, have exploited the theme of cannibal tribes. This subgenre experienced a period of popularity through the work of Italian filmmakers in the 1970s and 1980s. These films commonly concern the discovery of cannibalistic tribes by documentary filmmakers or anthropologists. The first major film of this type was Umberto Lenzi's Il Paese del Sesso Selvaggio ("The Man from the Deep River", 1972). Later filmmakers followed, and the genre reached its peak in the cannibal boom of 1977 to 1981. The best known of these films was Ruggero Deodato's influential Cannibal Holocaust (1980). Considered one of history's most gruesome movies, Cannibal Holocaust was commonly believed to be a snuff film, and Deodato was brought to trial on suspicion of having killed his actors. Other genre films include Ultimo mondo cannibale (1977) and Cannibal Ferox (1981).

Later horror films to feature cannibal groups include The Hills Have Eyes series, with its clan of cannibalistic savages, and the cannibalistic mountain men of Wrong Turn and its sequels. The film Como Era Gostoso o Meu Francês (How Tasty Was My Little Frenchman, 1971), by Nelson Pereira dos Santos, details the alleged cannibalistic practices of the indigenous Tupinamba warrior tribe against French and Portuguese colonizers in the 16th century.

Literature
Michael Crichton's techno-thriller novel State of Fear (2004) features scenes where the characters encounter cannibals on a remote Pacific island.

Terry Goodkind's The Sword of Truth fantasy series features the Mud People, a wild tribe which consumes the dried meat of their enemies before important events and rituals, believing it a way of gaining the enemies' wisdom. The Mud People were known to sometimes receive visions about the intentions of the victims and their people, and Richard himself received such a vision during one of the times he had to eat human flesh in order to participate in such an event. Kahlan, aware of that custom, pretended to be a vegetarian whenever visiting the tribe.

In Robert A. Heinlein's science fiction novel Stranger in a Strange Land (1961), some human culture is transformed as a result of the Martians' practice of eating one's dead friends as an act of great respect.

Herman Melville's Typee (1846) is a 19th-century literary example; Typee is a semi-factual account of Melville's voyage to the Pacific Island of Nuku Hiva, where he lived for several weeks among the island's cannibal inhabitants before fleeing.

Anne Rice's novel The Queen of the Damned (1988) references an ancient culture who practiced necro-cannibalism, as they believed that consumption of their loved ones' remains was a more fitting funeral rite than burial or cremation.

In Tennessee Williams' play Suddenly Last Summer (which debuted January 7, 1958) and its subsequent adaptations, the fate of the deceased son of Mrs. Venable is revealed to have been death at the hands of natives who then ate his remains.

The Transmetropolitan comic book series includes cultural cannibalism in its setting, where many bizarre and outlandish lifestyles are now common. Most notable is the fast-food chain "Long Pig", which serves the meat of braindead clones who are grown without a brain and thus are never "alive" as such.

In The Cannibal Within, by Mark Mirabello, "Ingestion is the ultimate act of domination.... The victim is absorbed by the eater--body and soul are absorbed--and all that remains is excrement."

In Rudy Rucker's novel Freeware (1997), a character named Wendy clones her own muscle cells, and sells the product as Wendy Meat. As it is her own body, offered voluntarily, it is not considered unethical in the novel.

In Cormac McCarthy's post-apocalyptic novel The Road (2006), humans resort to cannibalism to survive in a landscape where food is extremely scarce.

Video games
Aboleths in the Forgotten Realms setting of the Dungeons & Dragons role-playing game consume their parents on birth, and in so doing receive their parents' memories.

The Fallout series of video games, set in a post-apocalyptic America, has recurring themes of cannibalism. The most commonly seen ones are the Raiders, clans of savage killers living in the wasteland who habitually eat their victims flesh, which can be gained as an item called Strange Meat. Fallout 3 also has the community of Andale, a two-family clan emulating the faux-1950's culture of pre-war society, while simultaneously practicing both inbreeding and cannibalism, similar to the notorious Sawney Bean legend. Fallout: New Vegas has another notable example in the White Glove Society, an upper class aristocratic group based out of the luxurious Ultra-Luxe casino in Las Vegas, who are in reality the descendants of a cannibal tribe that once inhabited the ruins of Vegas before it was restored by Mr House. One of their chairmen is intending to return the group to its roots by serving the members human flesh without their knowledge, with the player having the choice of either helping or stopping him. From Fallout 3 and onward, the player may also become a cannibal through a perk. The perk allows the player to regain health at the expense of 'karma', the series' in-game morality meter. In addition, as most survivors abhor cannibalism, eating human flesh in-game may cause nearby NPC's to become distrustful or even hostile to the player.

The Elder Scrolls V: Skyrim, features a quest in which the dragonborn (player) discovers a clan of worshipers of the daedric prince, Namira, who consume the flesh of corpses found in the catacombs underneath Markarth. Players can then choose to either partake in the cannibalism, or put an end to it. Partaking will involve the player unlocking a ring that allows them to consume any humanoid corpse they find in order to recover some health.

The Last of Us features a group of cannibalistic survivors who kidnap Ellie during a winter snowstorm.

The plot of Until Dawn heavily features cannibalism. Near the end of the game it is revealed that after Hannah and Beth fell down a ravine and were presumed dead, Hannah actually survived and had to eat her sister's flesh to survive, which awakened the Wendigos the player encounters throughout the game.

As a means of survival
Cannibalism historically has been practiced as a last resort by famine sufferers, and popular culture has portrayed true stories of such acts of cannibalism. Examples include:

The story of the survivors of the Uruguayan Air Force Flight 571 chronicled in Piers Paul Read's book Alive: The Story of the Andes Survivors (1974), in Alive (1993), the book's film adaptation, and in the documentary Stranded: I've Come from a Plane that Crashed in the Mountains (2008).

Similar stories that have provided inspiration for popular culture adaptations are the accounts of Alferd Packer and of the Donner Party (1846–47), both of which involved people who ate human flesh in order to survive snowbound entrapment in the mountains.
Packer's tale is retold, with artistic liberty, in the film The Legend of Alfred Packer (1980)
Packer's tale is also retold, with artistic liberty, in Trey Parker's black comedy Cannibal! The Musical (1993). 
The film Ravenous (1999) combines elements of both stories. 
Stephen King's short story Survivor Type (1982) follows a shipwrecked surgeon who, stranded on a remote island, is driven to eat his own body parts in order to survive, using some heroin he was smuggling as anesthetic.
In The Buoys' Rupert Holmes-composed pop song "Timothy" (1971), two trapped miners are implied to have eaten their companion. "Timothy" was banned on many radio stations, but rose to no. 17 on the Billboard charts.

Several works are based on the real-life cannibal convict Alexander Pearce: 
The Australian novel For the Term of His Natural Life (1874) by Marcus Clarke uses the historical events in Tasmania surrounding the cannibal convict Alexander Pearce as background. 
Dying Breed (2008) is a fictional horror film about Pearce's cannibal decedents.
The Last Confession of Alexander Pearce (2008) is a biographic film about Pearce
Van Diemen's Land (2009) is a biographic film about Pearce
In the Mad Men series' penultimate episode "The Milk and Honey Route" (airdate May 10, 2015), a veteran at the American Legion Hall explains that he and two fellow members of their original nine-9-man unit survived the Battle of Hürtgen Forest by "bouncing" four German soldiers.

Post-apocalyptic narratives have also featured cannibalism as a means of survival:
The French film Delicatessen (1991) is set in an apartment block led by a butcher who deals with the food crisis by luring new tenants to the apartment, killing them, and serving them as meat to the other residents.
In Max Brooks' post-apocalyptic zombie horror novel World War Z (2006), American survivors head north into Canada to escape the undead, and are forced to cannibalize their dead in order to survive the harsh winters. 
Some of the survivors in Cormac McCarthy's novel The Road (2006) and its 2009 film adaptation practice cannibalism, as persistent and ubiquitous atmospheric ash has eliminated virtually all other sources of food. A scene in which the protagonist and his son discover a baby roasted over an open fire was edited from the film, but appeared in some versions of the film's trailer. 
A group of cannibals appear in the graphic novel The Walking Dead by Robert Kirkman and in the TV adaptation, at Terminus. The group, generally referred to as The Hunters, turned to cannibalizing other survivors due to their inability to hunt other prey or scavenging food. It is implied that the group started out by eating their own children in their desperation to survive, defending the decision by stating that the same occurs among animals in times of famine.
In the TV series The 100, a society of humans forced to live in a bunker to escape the effects of nuclear radiation has to resort to cannibalism for one year as their only other source of protein (a soybean crop) is killed by a fungus and takes one year to regrow. The eating of the human meat is depicted on screen. Furthermore it is stated that in the show's history a group of humans living in space after a nuclear war has to resort to cannibalism due to an event known as "the blight."
On the American television show Yellowjackets, a group of high school students (who primarily are members of the girls soccer team) who survive a plane crash in a remote area are forced to resort to cannibalism to survive.

Unaware cannibals
Popular culture depictions of cannibalism sometimes involve people who are unaware of their act and have been served human flesh by a murderous host. 
In Greek mythology, Tantalus served the Olympian gods the flesh of his son, Pelops. None of the gods were fooled except for Demeter, who ate part of his shoulder. 
In another myth, the Thracian king Tereus raped his wife Procne's sister Philomela and cut out her tongue to prevent her from telling anyone. Philomela nevertheless notified Procne, who gained her revenge by serving Tereus the flesh of their son, Itys.
The victims of legendary murderer Sweeney Todd are baked into meat pies, which are then sold in the streets of London. 
A variation on this theme occurs in The Untold Story series of Category 3 films, which portrays a fictionalized version of the real Eight Immortals Restaurant murders.
 Jaume Roig's 15th century novel Espill features a scene in which female innkeepers served men's meat to eat in their Parisian restaurant.
In William Shakespeare's late-16th century play Titus Andronicus, the character Tamora is unknowingly served a pie made from the remains of her two sons. 
In C. S. Lewis' The Silver Chair (1953), the protagonists stay in a castle of Narnian giants, who serve them venison. It is revealed that the venison came from a talking stag, which in Narnia is tantamount to cannibalism. 
In Arthur C. Clarke's short story, "The Food of the Gods" (1964), a synthesized-food corporation produces the "Ambrosia Plus" line of dishes, designed as a synthetic copy of human flesh, forcing competitors out of business and sparking a congressional investigation. 
In Fannie Flagg's novel Fried Green Tomatoes at the Whistle Stop Cafe, investigators are unknowingly fed the barbecued ribs of a man whose murder they are investigating.
A famous cinematic example is the science fiction film Soylent Green (1973), based on Harry Harrison's novel Make Room! Make Room! (1966). In the movie, the Soylent Corporation produces rations of small green wafers in response to a food crisis. These wafers are advertised as being produced from "high-energy plankton" but are actually the processed remains of human corpses. The film has been the subject of numerous parodies and popular culture references. This theme has been used in parodies and black comedies for its humorous value of dramatic irony. It is not present in the novel, which simply deals with issues of overpopulation and poverty rather than catastrophic environmental damage.
The musical parody The Rocky Horror Picture Show (1975) has a scene in which Dr. Frank N. Furter kills the character Eddie and serves his flesh to his dinner guests. 
In the film Eating Raoul (1982), a prudish married couple, Paul and Mary Bland, resort to killing and robbing affluent swingers to earn money for their dream restaurant. Their eventual partner in crime and blackmailer, Raoul, plans to kill Paul and run away with Mary. After she kills Raoul to save herself and her husband, they are scheduled to prepare dinner for a real estate agent helping them open their restaurant. With no main dish or time to shop, they prepare Raoul as the main course for the unwitting agent.
In the film Eat the Rich (1987), a disgruntled waiter and his friends kill the management and arrogant clientele of a restaurant and feed the bodies to unsuspecting customers. 
In the "Scott Tenorman Must Die" episode of the animated sitcom South Park, Eric Cartman takes revenge on 9th grader bully Scott Tenorman by having his parents killed, cooking them into chili, and feeding them to him.
 The Criminal Minds episode "Lucky" revolves around a cannibalistic serial killer who has secretly fed the meat of his victims to the unsuspecting customers of his diner and, in a disturbing ironic twist, to a search party looking for a missing girl whose meat they had just been fed.
 In Game of Thrones season 6, episode 10 ("The Winds of Winter"), Arya Stark avenges Walder Frey's slaughter of her family members at the Red Wedding by serving the unwitting Frey meat pie, then revealing she had killed his sons Lothar and Black Walder, and baked them into the pie he has been eating, before cutting Walder's throat. In contrast, in the show's source material, George R. R. Martin's books, Wyman Manderly, the Lord of White Harbor, avenges the Freys' murder of his son Wendell by serving at a wedding feast meat pies made from three dead Freys.

Sensual cannibalism
In the French film Trouble Every Day (2001), cannibalism is portrayed purely as a sexual act. Director Claire Denis explores the ability to love as a hunger, with the portrayal of characters that seem to have originated from a "diseased culture".
Love cannibalism is also a theme in Selina Sondermann's short film "Anthropophilie" (2015)
Luca Guadagnino's Bones and All portrays a pair of young cannibals in love.

As an accompaniment to killing

Some artistic and entertainment works are influenced by the morbid fascination surrounding real-life cases of cannibal murderers.

The Armin Meiwes cannibalism case in Germany inspired many feature films. For example: *Rohtenburg (2007) tells of an American criminal psychology student who studies cannibal killer Oliver Hartwin for her thesis. Hartwin fulfills his dream of eating a willing victim found on the Internet, and is modelled on Meiwes, whose complaints that his personal rights were violated led to a ban on the film in Germany. 
Cannibal (2006) depicted the event, and also was banned in Germany. 
Rosa von Praunheim's Dein Herz in Meinem Hirn (Your Heart in My Brain) depicts the case
 Ulli Lommel's Diary of a Cannibal (2006) depicts the case

Many heavy metal, death metal and grindcore bands and horrorcore rappers discuss cannibalism in their songs or depict it in the cover art of their albums, because of the act's taboo nature. A number of bands and works were inspired by the Meiwes case, such as:
 Rammstein's whose single "Mein Teil" (2004) features the refrain "you are what you eat". Vocalist Till Lindemann said "It's so sick that it becomes fascinating and there just has to be a song about it." *"The Wüstenfeld Man Eater" by American death/thrash metal band Macabre
"Eaten" by Bloodbath, 
"Let Me Taste Your Flesh" by Avulsed
"Cannibal Anthem" by the German electro-industrial project Wumpscut
 "Menschenfresser [Eat Me]" by Suicide Commando
"Human Consumption" by hip-hop artist Necro makes reference to the incident
The title of the Marilyn Manson album Eat Me, Drink Me (92007) was inspired by the case.

A number of significant works were based on the activities of Ed Gein, who served as inspiration for the characters:
Norman Bates in Psycho (1960)
Ezra Cobb in Deranged (1974)
Leatherface in The Texas Chain Saw Massacre (1974) and its sequels

A notable cannibalistic serial killer from fiction is Hannibal Lecter, a character created by author Thomas Harris. Lecter appears in the novels: Red Dragon (1981), The Silence of the Lambs (1988), Hannibal (1999) and Hannibal Rising (2006). Lecter was a background character in Red Dragon, and his cannibalism was not a plot point. Public fascination with the character led Harris to feature him in the sequel The Silence of the Lambs, where his cannibalism became a central feature of his character. The film based on the novel won several major Academy Awards, which rarely are awarded to horror films.

In science fiction
Works of science fiction sometimes include elements of cannibalism that serve purposes different from those already discussed.

In Gene Wolfe's series The Book of the New Sun (1980–1983), cannibalism and drugs are used to gain the memories of the dead. 
A parasitic infection causes its victims to become cannibals in Scott Westerfeld's novel Peeps (2005).
The post-apocalyptic novel Lucifer's Hammer (1977), by Larry Niven and Jerry Pournelle, features a band of survivors from a comet impact who turn to cannibalism not only as a means of food, but also as a way of binding members to their group.
Donald Kingsbury's Courtship Rite (serialized in 1982) explores a human culture planted on a world whose biochemistry is toxic to humans. Cannibalism is an essential part of both social and religious life, as food is a precious commodity and the only significant source of meat is the humans themselves.
The Sharing of Flesh by Poul Anderson depicts a planet where the colonists exhibit a mutation preventing puberty in males unless they be given a boost of exogenous testosterone. A rite of passage has developed where boys of the right age eat enough flesh of an adult male to jumpstart sexual development.
Last and First Men by Olaf Stapledon mentions that the 18th Men eat their dead.

Controversy 

In 2020 controversy over the racist themes of  the cartoon depiction of the missionaries and cannibals problem led the AQA exam board to withdraw a text book containing the cartoon.

See also
 Child cannibalism

References

Popular culture
Cannibalism in fiction
Topics in popular culture